"Radar Radio" is a single performed by Giorgio Moroder featuring Joe Pizzulo and written by Giorgio Moroder and Tom Whitlock. It was featured in the film Top Gun. The song was released in 1986 as a B-side to the hit split single that featured Berlin's "Take My Breath Away" on the A-side (which won the Academy Award for Best Original Song as well as the Golden Globe Award for Best Original Song in 1987). "Radar Radio" has not been included on any of the Top Gun soundtracks issued to date, making the vinyl single the only release. The song has never been released on CD and cassette.

Usage in Top Gun
In the film Top Gun, the song is heard playing on a jukebox at a bar during the last scene of the film as Tom Cruise's character has a drink. Only a few seconds of the song are heard before "You've Lost That Lovin' Feelin'" starts playing from the jukebox.

References

Songs about radio
1986 singles
Songs written by Giorgio Moroder
Giorgio Moroder songs
Joe Pizzulo songs
Columbia Records singles
1986 songs